Morten Ristorp Jensen (born 3 April 1986), known professionally as "Rissi", is a Danish producer, composer, songwriter and musician, as well as co-founder and previous member of Future Animals.

Personal life 
Morten Ristorp Jensen was born in 1986 at Rigshospitalet, Copenhagen, Denmark. He grew up in Tårnby (Amager) with his parents and two older siblings. He attended Løjtegårdsskolen (elementary school) and graduated in 2002 and went to Sankt Annæ Gymnasium on its special Basic Music Program (MGK). When he was not attending school, he played saxophone in The Tivoli Boys Guard from 1997 to 2002. After graduating from Sankt Annæ Gymnasium in 2006, he was accepted at Rhythmic Music Conservatory in Copenhagen in 2007. In 2010 he graduated with a BA in music from Rhythmic Music Conservatory on saxophone.

Career 
Morten Ristorp is co-producer of BackBone Studio and Future Animals, songwriter and musician. He is best known for international hits like "7 Years" (2015) by Lukas Graham. He also works with artists such as Kygo, Julia Michaels among others.

Besides being one of Lukas Graham's executive producers, he also temporarily played keyboard for the band from 2011 to 2012 due to the previous pianist, Anders Kirk, leaving. Ristorp filled the role until Kasper Daugaard joined the band. When Duagaard left in June 2016, Ristorp took the role of keyboardist again.

He won his first Award, Carl Prisen, in 2013 as Talent of the Year with Lukas Graham (the band) alongside his co-songwriters Stefan Forrest, Sebastian Fogh and Lukas Forchhammer.

Morten Ristorp was the third most-played Danish musician in 2015. In 2018 he was a producer on Lukas Graham's new album, including the single Love Someone. In 2020 he produced the some “Lose Somebody” by Kygo & OneRepublic that reached the Billboard Magazine music charts.
His music has appeared in major motion pictures including 2018's Fifty Shades Freed, and television series including The Greatest Dancer, The Reunion, and The Voice.

Discography

Awards and nominations 

Nominated by Danish Music Awards (DMA) as Danish Songwriter of the Year – Koda-Prisen in 2015 for Lukas Graham (Blue Album).

Notes

References 

1986 births
Living people
Lukas Graham
People from Tårnby Municipality